Bild is a surname. Notable people with the surname include:

 Andreas Bild (born 1971), Swedish footballer
 Fredrik Bild (born 1974), Swedish footballer, brother of Andreas and grand-nephew of Harry
 Harry Bild (born 1936), Swedish footballer
 Fred Bild, Canadian diplomat and adjunct professor